The 2019 North Carolina Education Lottery 200 was a NASCAR Gander Outdoors Truck Series race held on May 17, 2019, at Charlotte Motor Speedway in Concord, North Carolina. Contested over 134 laps on the 1.5-mile (2.4 km) asphalt speedway, it was the eighth race of the 2019 NASCAR Gander Outdoors Truck Series season.

Background

Track

The race was held at Charlotte Motor Speedway, which is located in Concord, North Carolina. The speedway complex includes a  quad-oval track, as well as a dragstrip and a dirt track. The speedway was built in 1959 by Bruton Smith and is considered the home track for NASCAR, as many race teams are based in the Charlotte metropolitan area. The track is owned and operated by Speedway Motorsports Inc. (SMI), with Marcus G. Smith serving as track president.

Entry list

Practice

First practice

Final practice

Qualifying

Qualifying results

Spencer Boyd and Austin Wayne Self started at the rear for having unapproved adjustments to their trucks after qualifying.

Race

Summary
Matt Crafton began on pole, but was quickly overtaken by Todd Gilliland and Ben Rhodes. Natalie Decker made contact with the wall early in the race, damaging the right side of her truck and bringing out the first caution. Kyle Busch would lead most of Stage 1 but give up the win after pitting with 5 laps to go in the stage. Crafton won the stage after passing and battling Gilliland for the lead.

When Stage 2 started, Busch quickly overtook Ross Chastain and dominated, staying out when a caution occurred with 56 laps remaining due to Gus Dean spinning out and collecting Korbin Forrister and Angela Ruch. When another caution followed soon after due to debris on the track, Busch pitted and lost the lead.

Busch would chase and overtake Ben Rhodes and Johnny Sauter with 39 laps to go, ultimately winning the race as Sauter failed to keep up speed on the restart and held back some of the field. This was Busch's last truck race of 2019, making him undefeated in the season.

Stage Results

Stage One
Laps: 40

Stage Two
Laps: 40

Final Stage Results

Stage Three
Laps: 54

References

NASCAR races at Charlotte Motor Speedway
2019 in sports in North Carolina
North Carolina Education Lottery 200